This is a list of medical journals in dentistry by specialty.

Periodontics
Journal of Clinical Periodontology
Journal of Indian Society of Periodontology
Journal of Periodontology

Orthodontics
American Journal of Orthodontics and Dentofacial Orthopedics
The Angle Orthodontist
Journal of Clinical Orthodontics
Journal of Dental Biomechanics
Journal of Orthodontics
Seminars in Orthodontics

Prosthodontics
European Journal of Prosthodontics
European Journal of Prosthodontics and Restorative Dentistry
Journal of Indian Prosthodontic Society
Journal of Prosthetic Dentistry
Journal of Prosthodontics

Pediatrics
International Journal of Paediatric Dentistry
Journal of Pediatric Dentistry

Oral surgery
Cleft Palate-Craniofacial Journal
Dental Traumatology
International Journal of Oral and Maxillofacial Surgery
Journal of Oral and Maxillofacial Surgery
Oral Surgery, Oral Medicine, Oral Pathology and Oral Radiology

Endodontics
Journal of Endodontics

General (restorative) dentistry
Brazilian Dental Journal
British Dental Journal
Caries Research
Clinical, Cosmetic and Investigational Dentistry
Community Dentistry and Oral Epidemiology
Dental Materials
Frontiers of Oral Biology
International Journal of Oral Science
Journal of the American Dental Association
Journal of Conservative Dentistry
Journal of Dental Research
Journal of Dentistry
Primary Dental Journal

Oncology
Oral Oncology

Oral radiology
Journal of Oral and Maxillofacial Radiology
Oral Surgery, Oral Medicine, Oral Pathology, Oral Radiology and Endodontics

External links
Orthodontic Journals

Dental
Journals